Dimitrios Emmanouilidis (born 24 October 2000) is a Greek professional footballer who plays as a winger for Danish club Vejle.

Career

Panathinaikos
Emmanouilidis joined Panathinaikos from the youth ranks of the team. He made his first professional appearance for the team in the 2017–18 Greek Cup game against Panachaiki on 29 November 2017. Over the summer of 2018, he attracted the interest of Europe’s top scouts at the Mediterranean Games where he scored 2 goals for the Greece U18 team as Greece finished top of the group ahead of Turkey and France and made the semi finals. Emmanouilidis scored against both of these countries. Interest from overseas teams peaked but Panathinaikos helf firm and kept him. This came after he scored 19 goals for the Panathinaikos U20 team.

In September 2018, he scored his first goal as a professional player, with a side-footed kick after being teed up by Argyris Kampetsis, in a 3–1 home win Super League game against Lamia, being the first player born in the 21st century to score in Greek Superleague. On the last matchday of the 2018–19 season, having come on as a substitute, Emmanouilidis completed the scoring in a 4–0 defeat of Panetolikos with the rebound from Nikos Giannakopoulos' blocked shot.

Loan to Panionios
With little prospect of first-team football at Panathinaikos after the arrival of Ghayas Zahid and Yohan Mollo, Emmanouilidis joined fellow Super League club Panionios on loan for the 2019–20 season. He scored twice in a 3–0 win away to Olympiacos Volos in the Greek Cup, and his first league goal for Panionios was an 88th-minute equaliser at home to Olympiacos on 23 November, having entered the game only eight minutes earlier. A week later he scored at the extra time sealing a vital 3–0 home win game against Panetolikos in his club effort to avoid relegation. On 15 December 2019, he opened the score in a 2–1 away loss against Volos. On 1 March 2020, Bachana Arabuli spread the ball across the box to Emmanouilidis who calmly tapped it into the empty net with Panagiotis Tsintotas helpless, to open the score in a 1–1 home draw against AEK Athens.

Loan to Fortuna Sittard 
On 1 February 2021, Emmanouilidis moved to Eredivisie club Fortuna Sittard on a loan deal until the end of the season. The deal includes a purchase option.

Vejle
The 20-year-old was left out of Ivan Jovanovic's plans at Panathinaikos and sought to find a club, so that he could leave with a regular transfer and not on loan. Panathinaikos sold him at a range  of €500,000 and Panathinaikos will have a resale rate of 20-25%, while Emmanouilidis will earn approximately €200,000 per year. It is worth noting that it is one of the most expensive transfers in the history of Vejle, which convinced the young striker with its project. The Greek footballer played a total of 22 times with Panathinaikos, scoring five goals and giving two assists. On 1 August 2021, he scored his first goal with the club in a 2–2 home draw against Brøndby IF.

Career statistics

Club

References

External links

2000 births
Living people
Greek footballers
Panathinaikos F.C. players
Panionios F.C. players
Greece under-21 international footballers
Greece youth international footballers
Super League Greece players
Association football forwards
Competitors at the 2018 Mediterranean Games
Mediterranean Games bronze medalists for Greece
Mediterranean Games medalists in football
People from Boeotia
Vejle Boldklub players
Fortuna Sittard players

Footballers from Central Greece